Moheibacter is a genus of bacteria from the family of Weeksellaceae.

References

Flavobacteria
Bacteria genera
Taxa described in 2014